The Old Gaffers Association (OGA - The Association for Gaff Rig Sailing) is an unincorporated association formed in 1963 in the United Kingdom to promote the use of the Gaff rig.

It currently states its aim as 'to encourage interest in gaff rig, lug and spritsail rigs'. It was originally created in the early 1960s when some recreational sailors became concerned that traditional sailing boats were disappearing from British shores. It was hoped that holding races specifically for traditional boats would encourage people to own and maintain the boats. The activities have expanded over the years and now include a range of sailing and social events including winter lectures, cruising in company and events for small boats.

The rules of the association require every area to hold at least one event every year which should include a race for gaff rigged boats. Most areas hold additional events including:

 The Yarmouth Gaffers Regatta in the Solent (was held biennially, but in September 2018 it was announced that the event would no longer be held)
 The August Classics Cruise in Suffolk and Essex
 The Dublin Bay OGA Regatta
 The Campbelltown Classics
 Portaferry Sails and Sounds
 Holyhead Traditional Boat Festival

The OGA has a Youth Fund which provides small grants to OGA Areas to help fund events which get young people out sailing on traditionally rigged boats. Grants can also be made, on the recommendation of OGA Areas, for non-OGA projects fitting the criteria of the fund. 

The OGA has members all over the world. It has close links with affiliated associations in France, the Netherlands (which has members in Belgium), Canada and Australia.

History 

The first ever ‘Old Gaffers’ race was held on the Solent in 1959, with just 13 boats. A similar race was held on the east coast of England in 1963. The growing success of these early races, open to gaff rig boats, led to the formation of the OGA as a national association at the Little Ship Club, Maldon, Essex in 1963. In the early days, activities were focussed on rescuing or preserving old gaff rigged boats. 

Over the years areas have come and gone but Sailing Gaffers provides some indication of when the current areas started.

 1963 Solent,  East Coast
 1973 South West, Scotland
 1974 North East
 1978 Bristol Channel
 1989 Northern Ireland, North West
 1991 Dublin Bay
 1997 North Wales
 2004 Trailer Section

In 2013 the association celebrated its 50th anniversary with the publication of a book of stories from the history of the Association. 21 member boats from the UK and the Netherlands took part in a UK circumnavigation (Round Britain Challenge) and hosted a number of area based events culminating in a Golden Jubilee Festival at Cowes attended by more than 180 gaff-rigged boats.

References

External links 
 OGA Website
 Netherlands OGA
 British Columbia OGA
 OGA Western Australia
 Fédération des Vieux Gréements de France

Non-profit organisations based in the United Kingdom
Sailing in the United Kingdom
Sailing associations